The Sinhala Kingdom or Sinhalese Kingdom refers to the successive Sinhalese kingdoms that existed in what is today Sri Lanka. The Sinhalese kingdoms are kingdoms known by the city at which its administrative centre was located. These are in chronological order: the kingdoms of Tambapanni, Upatissa Nuwara, Anuradhapura, Polonnaruwa, Dambadeniya, Gampola, Kotte, Sitawaka and Kandy.

The Sinhala kingdom ceased to exist by 1815, following the British takeover. While the Sinhala kingdom existed from 543 BCE to 1815 CE, other political entities co-existed in Sri Lanka spanning certain partial periods, including the Jaffna kingdom (which existed 1215–1624 CE), Vanni chieftaincies (which existed from 12th century –1803 CE) and the Portuguese and Dutch colonies (Which existed 1597–1658 CE and 1640–1796 respectively). During these partial periods of time, these political entities were not part of the Sinhala Kingdom, except Jaffna and the Vanni chieftaincies following the invasion by Parakramabahu VI, until his death.

Records by Faxian thero and the Mahavamsa suggests it may have extended to Maldives and parts of India as well.

Epochs
 Kingdom of Tambapanni (543 BC–505 BC)
 Kingdom of Upatissa Nuwara (505–377 BC)
 Kingdom of Anuradhapura (377 BC – 1017 AD)
 Kingdom of Polonnaruwa (1056–1236)
 Kingdom of Dambadeniya (1236–1272)
 Kingdom of Gampola (1345–1408)
 Kingdom of Kotte (1408–1598)
 Kingdom of Sitawaka (1521–1593)
 Kingdom of Kandy (1590–1815)

Notes

References

Names of Sri Lanka
History of Sri Lanka
Former monarchies of South Asia